Hasan Rizvić (born 18 January 1984) is a Bosnian-born Slovenian professional basketball player for KK Šenčur of Slovenian League.

Professional career
Rizvić began his career playing with KK Čelik but moved to Slovenia when he was 18-years-old where he spent 6 seasons. He later received Slovenian citizenship and started playing for Slovenian junior national teams. He then played two years in the Ukrainian League before joining UNICS Kazan in 2010.

In July 2011 he returned to BC Azovmash, signing a two-year contract. In August 2012 he signed with Enisey Krasnoyarsk in Russia. In August 2013, he signed with Krasny Oktyabr. He was waived on 17 December 2013. On 20 December 2013, he signed with Gamateks Pamukkale Üniversitesi for the rest of the season. In October 2014, he signed with La Bruixa d'Or Manresa for the rest of the season.

On 8 August 2015, he signed with Orkide Gediz Üniversitesi of the Turkish Basketball Second League. In September 2016, he signed with Gelişim Koleji.

National team
As a member of the Slovenian national basketball team he played at the 2010 FIBA World Championship.

References

External links 
 Hasan Rizvić at acb.com
 Hasan Rizvić at fiba.com (game-center)
 Hasan Rizvić at fiba.com
 Hasan Rizvić at euroleague.net

1984 births
Living people
ABA League players
Bàsquet Manresa players
Bosnia and Herzegovina emigrants to Slovenia
Bosnia and Herzegovina expatriate basketball people in Spain
Bosnia and Herzegovina men's basketball players
Bosniaks of Bosnia and Herzegovina
Centers (basketball)
BC Azovmash players
BC Enisey players
BC Krasny Oktyabr players
BC UNICS players
KK Budućnost players
KK Olimpija players
Liga ACB players
Sportspeople from Zenica
Slovenian expatriate basketball people in Spain
Slovenian men's basketball players
Slovenian people of Bosnia and Herzegovina descent
Slovenian people of Bosniak descent
2010 FIBA World Championship players